A New Abolition is the first studio album The Wrecking. It was released on August 19, 2008 by Chosen Records, and was produced by Jonathan Wyman.

Critical reception

AllMusic's Jared Johnson said that "with each track, it becomes more apparent that lead vocalist and guitarist Doug Elder has created a truly unique modern worship sound. The good vibes are sustained throughout the record, a tribute to the ingenuity of approaching modern worship from an entirely new direction. The East Coast Christian band conveys well-contemplated worship themes through a sound that is at once groovy, powerful, introspective, and futuristic." In addition, Johnson wrote that "with just enough indie creativity to keep things interesting, A New Abolition was one of the most challenging and satisfying albums of 2008."

Mike of Alternative Addiction said, "'A New Abolition' should be accepted for what it is, an extremely competent if unspectacular pop rock major label debut."

Jesus Freak Hideout's Laura Sproull said that "the mission of this group is completely transparent through their music: to share the love of Jesus Christ and bring hope to the lost. A New Abolition only continues to help solidify this sole purpose and the band’s future success." Lastly, Sproull wrote that "while The Wrecking may be considered reminiscent of bands such as Cross Culture and Mutemath, their music possesses a distinctive sound all their own. And while some may view this record as nothing groundbreaking and extraordinary, it sure gives this pop/rock quartet the jumpstart needed for acclamation and exposure."

Track listing

Personnel 

 Doug Elder - vocals, guitar 
 Darren Elder - drums 
 Karl Anderson - keys, bass guitar, backing vocals
 Chris James - guitar

Charts

Album

References

External links
 AllMusic

2008 debut albums
The Wrecking albums